Eva Randová (born 31 December 1936) is a Czech operatic mezzo-soprano who made an international career based in Germany. She appeared at major opera houses including the Metropolitan Opera, and at festivals such as the Bayreuth Festival. She is known for performing Czech operas by Leoš Janáček and Antonín Dvořák.

Career 
Born in Kolín, Czech Republic, on 31 December 1936, Randová was a Czech champion in swimming several times. She first worked as a teacher of sports and math. She then studied voice at the Prague Conservatory.

She made her debut on the opera stage in 1962 in Ostrava and Prague. She joined the ensemble of the Staatsoper Stuttgart in 1971.

She appeared at the Bayreuth Festival first in 1973 as Waltraute in Wagner's Die Walküre and as Gutrune in Götterdämmerung, performing these parts also the following two years. In 1975, she also appeared as Kundry in Parsifal, singing the part also in 1976, 1977 and 1981. She appeared as Fricka in 1977 in the Jahrhundertring, the centenary production of Wagner's Der Ring des Nibelungen staged by Patrice Chéreau and conducted by Pierre Boulez.

She appeared at the Deutsche Oper Berlin as Azucena in Verdi's Il trovatore and as Laura in Ponchielli's La Gioconda. She sang at the Cologne Opera Klytämnestra in Elektra by Richard Strauss and as Ortrud in Wagner's Lohengrin. She was a guest at the  Paris Opera and the Metropolitan Opera, among others. She took two parts in Dvořák's Rusalka at the Vienna State Opera in the 1980s, the mezzo part of the witch and the soprano part of the foreign princess.

Her portrayal of the Kostelnička Buryjovka in Janáček's Jenůfa at the Royal Opera House was nominated for a 1987 Laurence Olivier Award in the category Outstanding Achievement in Opera. She was the director (Intendantin) of the State Opera in Prague.

Selected recordings 
The German National Library holds recordings by Eva Randová, including:
 Ortrud in Wagner's Lohengrin
 Kostelnička Buryjovka in Janáček Jenufa
 Title role in Janáček's The Cunning Little Vixen
 Witch and foreign princess in Dvořák's Rusalka
 Vlasta in Zdeněk Fibich's Šárka
 Lola in Schreker's Irrelohe

 Mahler's Second Symphony
 Janáček's Glagolitic Mass
 Plácido Domingo: Covent Garden Gala Concert

Bibliography 
 Karl-Josef Kutsch / Leo Riemens: Großes Sängerlexikon (Saur Verlag)
 Liner notes of the CD "Arien und Szenen aus Opern von Antonín Dvořák"

References

External links 
 
 Eva Randová at the Bayerisches Musiker Lexikon Online 
 
 Eva Randová at the Czech National Library

20th-century Czech women opera singers
Operatic mezzo-sopranos
1936 births
Living people
Jan Evangelista Purkyně University in Ústí nad Labem alumni
Prague Conservatory alumni
People from Kolín